Platinum is a chemical element with symbol Pt and atomic number 78.

Platinum may also refer to:

Places
 Platinum, Alaska, a city
 The Platinum, a condo hotel near the Las Vegas Strip

Arts, entertainment, and media

Fictional entities
 Platinum, one of the Metal Men, a comic book superhero group
 Star Platinum, Jotaro Kujo's stand in JoJo's Bizarre Adventure

Games
 Platinum range, a budget package of PlayStation games now titled Essential
 Pokémon Platinum, the third installation of the fourth generation of Pokémon video games

Music

Groups 
 Platinum (quartet), a championship barbershop quartet
 Platnum, a British vocal group

Albums
 Platinum (Casiopea album), 1987
 Platinum (Miranda Lambert album), 2014
 Platinum (Dean Miller album)
 Platinum (Mike Oldfield album), 1979
 Platinum (The Headhunters album), 2011

Songs
 "Platinum" (Maaya Sakamoto song), 1999
 "Platinum" (Snoop Dogg song), 2011

Other music
 Platinum album or platinum record, a music recording sales certification that an album or single has sold a minimum number of copies

Other arts, entertainment, and media
 Platinum (film), a 1997 TV film featuring Maxim Roy
 Platinum (musical), a 1979 Broadway musical
 Platinum (TV series), a short-lived 2003 television series on the UPN network

Organizations and enterprises
 PLATINUM (cybercrime group), an advanced persistent threat
 Platinum Asset Management, an Australian asset management company
 Platinum Party, a minor political party in British Columbia
 Platinum Studios, a US-based comic book publisher and media developer
 PlatinumGames, a Japan-based independent video game development company

Science
 Isotopes of platinum
 Platinum group, a collective name used for six chemical elements in the periodic table

Ships
 Platinum, a former name of the private yacht Dubai
 Platinum, a former name of the cruise ship MV Discovery

Other uses
 Platinum (color), a pale greyish-white color
 Platinum (theme), a user interface theme used in Mac OS 8 and Mac OS 9
 Platinum, a precious metal commodity
 Platinum, as coinage
 Platinum Card

See also

 The Platinum Collection (disambiguation)